Marooned on Ghostring is a 1981 role-playing game adventure published by Judges Guild for Traveller.

Plot summary
Marooned on Ghostring is an adventure that takes place in the fourth sector of Judges Guild's Gateway Quadrant, in which the player characters are marooned on Ghostring until they can repair their spacecraft, damaged in misjump.

Publication history
Marooned on Ghostring was written by Walter Bledsaw and Dorothy Bledsaw and was published in 1981 by Judges Guild as a 32-page book.

Reception
William A. Barton reviewed Marooned on Ghostring in The Space Gamer No. 48. Barton commented that "While better conceived than the average Group One planetary adventure, Marooned on Ghostring falls short of the past Guild efforts, though an enterprising ref might be able to make use of its basic situation with some careful modifications."

Michael Stackpole reviewed Marooned on Ghostring in The Space Gamer No. 50. Stackpole commented that "less than half of it is text, the rest is illustrations [...] If you look carefully, you notice that the same piece of dreadful artwork used on the back of the booklet is used as an interior illo."

References

Judges Guild publications
Role-playing game supplements introduced in 1981
Traveller (role-playing game) adventures